The 1987 Tulsa Golden Hurricane football team represented the University of Tulsa as an independent during the 1987 NCAA Division I-A football season. In their first and only year under head coach George Henshaw, the Golden Hurricane compiled a 3–8 record. The team's statistical leaders included quarterback T. J. Rubley with 2,058 passing yards, Derrick Ellison with 593 rushing yards, and Dan Bitson with 608 receiving yards.

Schedule

Roster

References

Tulsa
Tulsa Golden Hurricane football seasons
Tulsa Golden Hurricane football